The Toyota GZ engine family consists of a single model, the 1GZ-FE. This engine is used as the powerplant for the second generation Century limousine from 1997 to 2017.

1GZ-FE 
The 1GZ-FE is a  48-valve DOHC V12 engine with variable valve timing (VVT-i). Bore is 81 mm and stroke is 80.8 mm, with a compression ratio of 10.5:1. The Electronic fuel-injection system is controlled by two ECUs, one for each bank of six cylinders. The engine is capable of running on either bank should a malfunction occur.

In 2010 the standard engine was revised in order to meet tough fuel economy and emissions standards, reducing power slightly and peak torque to  although this torque figure had been advertised in export markets since at least 2004.

Applications
 1997–2017 Toyota Century (GZG50)
 2006–2008 Toyota Century Royal

1GZ-FNE 

Applications
 2003–2004 Toyota Century

See also 
List of Toyota engines
Acoustic Control Induction System

References 

GZ
V12 engines
Gasoline engines by model